Pseudacherontides is a genus of springtails in the family Hypogastruridae. There are about nine described species in Pseudacherontides.

Species
These nine species belong to the genus Pseudacherontides:
 Pseudacherontides aspinatus (Stach, 1959) i c
 Pseudacherontides bisetosus (Stach, 1959) i c g
 Pseudacherontides bulgaricus (Martynova & al., 1971) i c g
 Pseudacherontides crassus (Stach, 1959) i c g
 Pseudacherontides edaphicus (Yosii, 1971) i c g
 Pseudacherontides spelaeus (Ionesco, 1922) i c g
 Pseudacherontides stachi (Ljovushkin, 1972) i c g
 Pseudacherontides vivax (Yosii, 1956) i c g
 Pseudacherontides zenkevitchi Djanaschvili, 1971 i c g
Data sources: i = ITIS, c = Catalogue of Life, g = GBIF, b = Bugguide.net

References

Further reading

 
 
 

Collembola
Springtail genera